Dos pesos dejada ("Two Pesos Left") is a 1949 Mexican film. It stars Sara García.

External links
 

1949 films
1940s Spanish-language films
Mexican black-and-white films
Mexican comedy-drama films
1949 comedy-drama films
1940s Mexican films